Paulina Peda (born 18 March 1998) is a Polish backstroke and butterfly swimmer. She competed in the 2020 Summer Olympics.

References

1998 births
Living people
Sportspeople from Chorzów
Swimmers at the 2020 Summer Olympics
Polish female backstroke swimmers
Polish female butterfly swimmers
Olympic swimmers of Poland